The Albertinian line was a line of the Habsburg dynasty, begun by Duke Albert III of Austria, who, after death of his elder brother Rudolf IV, divided the Habsburg hereditary lands with his brother Leopold III by the 1379 Treaty of Neuberg. The branch finally became extinct in the male line with the early death of Ladislaus the Posthumous in 1457.

History
According to the terms of the treaty, Albert was the ruler over the Duchy of Austria proper, while the southern territories (Inner Austria) were ruled by his brother - Leopold III, ancestor of the Leopoldian line. Albert ruled over Austria until his death in 1395. His only son and heir was also called Albert, he took the rule over his territories as Albert IV and quickly came to terms with his Leopoldian cousins William, Leopold IV, Ernest and Frederick IV. When Albert IV died in 1404 he left a minor son - Duke Albert V of Austria, who remained under the tutelage of his Leopoldine uncles William (until 1406) and Leopold IV (until 1411).

Having assumed the rule over Austria, Albert V in 1421 married Elizabeth of Luxembourg, the only child of Emperor Sigismund. After Sigismund's death in 1437, he was crowned King of Hungary and King of Bohemia. In 1438 he also was elected King of the Romans (as Albert II) and Emperor-to-be, anticipating the powers of the later Habsburg monarchy, however, he died the next year. The Hungarian throne passed to Polish king Władysław III against the fierce resistance of Albert's widow Elizabeth.

Albert had left a son who was born only after his death, thereby known as Ladislaus the Posthumous. Ladislaus had to wait for many years for the moment when he could start to govern his territories. Heir of both the Kingdom of Bohemia and the Kingdom of Hungary, he remained under the tutelage of his Leopoldian cousin Frederick V, who in 1440 had been elected King of the Romans upon Albert's death. Ladislaus' claims to Hungary were acknowledged after King Władysław had been killed in the 1444 Battle of Varna, however, he became the real ruler only after the death of regent John Hunyadi in 1456. As he had no children, his sudden death in 1457 ended the history of the Albertinian line. Its holdings in Austria reverted to his cousin Duke Frederick V.

Genealogy
 Albert III with the Pigtail (1349–1395), Duke of Austria from 1365 until his death, Duke of Styria, Carinthia, Carniola and Count of Tyrol (jointly with his brother Leopold III) until 1379
 X (1) Elizabeth of Luxembourg (1358–1373), daughter of Emperor Charles IV, Holy Roman Emperor 
 X (2) Beatrice of Hohenzollern (c. 1362–1414), daughter of Burgrave Frederick V of Nuremberg
 (2) Albert IV the Patient (1377–1404), Duke of Austria from 1395 until his death
 X Joanna Sophia of Wittelsbach (c.1373–1410), daughter of Duke Albert I of Bavaria 
 Margaret (1395–1447)
 X Duke Henry XVI of Bavaria
 Albert V the Magnanimous (1397–1439), Duke of Austria from 1404, King of Hungary from 1437, King of Bohemia and King of the Romans (as Albert II) from 1438 until his death
 X Elizabeth of Luxembourg (1409–1442), daughter of Emperor Sigismund, King of Bohemia and Hungary
 Anne (1432–1462)
 X Landgrave William III of Thuringia
 George (1435)
 Elizabeth (1436–1505)
 X Casimir IV Jagiellon, Grand Duke of Lithuania and King of Poland
 Ladislaus the Posthumous (1440–1457), Duke of Austria from 1440, King of Hungary (as Ladislaus V) from 1444 and King of Bohemia from 1453 until his death
Line extinct

See also
Habsburg family tree

Habsburg Bohemia
Hungarian noble families